Gołębie may refer to the following places:
Gołębie, Lublin Voivodeship (east Poland)
Gołębie, Masovian Voivodeship (east-central Poland)
Gołębie, Podlaskie Voivodeship (north-east Poland)